Ogeum-dong is a neighbourhood, dong of Songpa-gu, Seoul, South Korea.

Education
Schools located in Ogeum-dong:
 Seoul Gaerong Elementary School
 Seoul Geoyeo Elementary School
 Seoul Ogeum Elementary School
 Boin Middle School
 Ogeum Middle School
 Oju Middle School
 Seryun Middle School
 Boin High School
 Ogeum High School

Transportation 
 Bangi station of 
 Gaerong station of

See also
Gayageum
Im Gyeong-eop
Second Manchu invasion of Korea
Administrative divisions of South Korea

References

External links
 Ogeum-dong resident center website
 Songpa-gu map

Neighbourhoods of Songpa District